Most Wanted may refer to:

Law enforcement
A most wanted list used by a law enforcement agency to alert the public, such as:
FBI Ten Most Wanted Fugitives
FBI Most Wanted Terrorists
ICE Most Wanted
List of Mexico's 37 most-wanted drug lords
List of most wanted fugitives in Italy
Saudi list of most wanted suspected terrorists
NIA Most Wanted, India's National Investigation Agency
U.S. list of most-wanted Iraqis
List of most-wanted Nazi war criminals, Simon Wiesenthal Center
Most Wanted, successor to UK NCA Operation Captura in Spain

Media

Film
Most Wanted (1997 film), US
Most Wanted (2011 film),  Indian Odia-language film
Most Wanted (2020 film), Canada
India's Most Wanted, 2019 Indian film

Music
Most Wanted (Hilary Duff album)
Most Wanted (Kane & Abel album)
Most Wanted (MOK album)
Most Wanted: The Greatest Hits
Most Wanted, a mixtape by SpotemGottem

Television
FBI: Most Wanted, 2020
"Most Wanted (FBI), pilot
MTV's Most Wanted, 1992
Most Wanted (1976 TV series), 1976–77
"Most Wanted" (Beavis and Butt-head), an episode
Marvel's Most Wanted, a TV pilot
India's Most Wanted, 1999 Indian crime television series

Video games
Need for Speed: Most Wanted (2005 video game), a racing game
Need for Speed: Most Wanted (2012 video game), a racing game

See also

America's Most Wanted (disambiguation)